Staphylococcus equorum is a gram-positive, coagulase-negative member of the bacterial genus Staphylococcus consisting of clustered cocci. Originally isolated from the skin of healthy horses, this species contains a cell wall similar to that of Staphylococcus xylosus.

Strains of S. equorum have been isolated from sausage and strains comprising subspecies of this species have been isolated from Swiss mountain cheeses.

References

External links
Type strain of Staphylococcus equorum at BacDive -  the Bacterial Diversity Metadatabase

equorum
Bacteria described in 1984